San Juan Bautista (Spanish for "Saint John the Baptist") is a city in San Benito County, in the U.S. state of California. The population was 2,089 as of the 2020 census. San Juan Bautista was founded in 1797 by the Spanish under Fermín de Lasuén, with the establishment of Mission San Juan Bautista. Following the Mexican secularization of 1833, the town was briefly known as San Juan de Castro and eventually incorporated in 1896. Today, San Juan is a popular tourist destination, as the home of the San Juan Bautista State Historic Park and other important historic sites, as well as cultural institutions like El Teatro Campesino.

The location was used for scenes in the Alfred Hitchcock film Vertigo, yjough the church tower was demolished and added by special effects.

History

Prior to the arrival of Europeans, the area around San Juan Bautista was populated by the Mutsun, a tribe of the Ohlone Nation of Indigenous Californians. The Mutsunes lived in villages in the area around San Juan Bautista, in settlements composed of thatched huts made of willow and native grasses.

Spanish period
In 1797, the Spanish Franciscan priest fray Fermín de Lasuén founded Mission San Juan Bautista to facilitate the conversion of the native people to Catholicism; in the process, he claimed the land for the Spanish Empire. Lasuén chose the site because of the area's fertile cropland, steady water supply, and sizable Indian population.

Construction of the current mission church began in 1803, and has served the community continuously since 1812. The mission was located on the Camino Real, a "royal highway" which connected the California missions and which remained well-used until the 19th century.

Mexican period

In 1821, Mexico revolted against Spain, winning independence for itself, and making California a province of the newly independent Mexico. By 1834, a town known as San Juan de Castro has sprouted up around the mission. It drew its name from the town's prominent alcalde José Tiburcio Castro. In 1834 the mission was secularized, and Castro appointed executor of the property. Accordingly, he divided and auctioned off the former mission properties. His son, José Castro, built the Castro Adobe on the south side of the Plaza de San Juan in 1840; however, Castro's frequent involvement in government kept him from spending much time there. Castro was a key member of the overthrow of governors Nicolás Gutiérrez in 1836 and Manuel Micheltorena in 1844.

After defeating Micheltorena and his ill-equipped army, José Antonio Castro was appointed Comandante General of California, in charge of the Mexican Army's operations in California. From San Juan Bautista, Castro ordered the army against potential foreign incursions. He kept especially close watch over the movements of John C. Frémont, an American military officer who had been let into California to conduct a survey of the interior. Though given explicit instructions to stay away from coastal settlements, Frémont soon broke the agreement by taking his team to Monterey, a potential military target. When Castro told Frémont he would have to leave the country, the situation came close to war when he obstinately refused to leave and instead set up a base on Gavilán Peak, overlooking the town of San Juan. However, fighting was avoided and Frémont, grudgingly, withdrew.

American period

San Juan Bautista incorporated as a city on May 4, 1896.

In June 1904, early aviation pioneer John J. Montgomery made a series of successful test flights using his tandem-wing glider in San Juan. This was a prototype to his 1905 gliders that were used to make the first successful high-altitude flights in heavier-than-air flying machines in the world.

Recently, using old photographs and eyewitness accounts, researchers were able to estimate the location of the hypocenter of the 1906 San Francisco earthquake as offshore from San Francisco, or near the city of San Juan Bautista, confirming previous estimates.

In 1930, the last native speaker of Mutsun, Ascención Solórzano de Cervantes, passed away, rendering the Mutsun language extinct.

In 1971, Luis Valdez moved El Teatro Campesino, one of the most important cultural institutions of the Chicano Movement, to San Juan. Initially, they only had use of La Calavera Theatre, but eventually also built out a larger theatre, simple known as El Teatro Campesino.

Geography

The Gabilán Range is to the south of San Juan Bautista. The San Andreas Fault runs through San Juan Bautista. Fremont Peak, overlooking the town of San Juan, is open to the public as Fremont Peak State Park.

Climate
This region experiences warm (but not hot) and dry summers, with no average monthly temperatures above 71.6 °F.  According to the Köppen Climate Classification system, San Juan Bautista has a warm-summer Mediterranean climate, abbreviated "Csb" on climate maps.

Demographics

2010

At the 2010 census San Juan Bautista had a population of 1,862. The racial makeup of San Juan Bautista was 1,125 (60.4%) White, 12 (0.6%) African American, 58 (3.1%) Native American, 52 (2.8%) Asian, 2 (0.1%) Pacific Islander, 494 (26.5%) from other races, and 119 (6.4%) from two or more races. There were 907 Hispanic or Latino residents, of any race (48.7%).

The mission had 1,248 Mutsun Native Americans.
The census reported that 1,857 people (99.7% of the population) lived in households, 5 (0.3%) lived in non-institutionalized group quarters, and no one was institutionalized.

There were 681 households, 229 (33.6%) had children under the age of 18 living in them, 345 (50.7%) were opposite-sex married couples living together, 86 (12.6%) had a female householder with no husband present, 48 (7.0%) had a male householder with no wife present.  There were 42 (6.2%) unmarried opposite-sex partnerships, and 8 (1.2%) same-sex married couples or partnerships. 157 households (23.1%) were one person and 48 (7.0%) had someone living alone who was 65 or older. The average household size was 2.73.  There were 479 families (70.3% of households); the average family size was 3.21.

The age distribution was 431 people (23.1%) under the age of 18, 178 people (9.6%) aged 18 to 24, 476 people (25.6%) aged 25 to 44, 556 people (29.9%) aged 45 to 64, and 221 people (11.9%) who were 65 or older.  The median age was 38.7 years. For every 100 females, there were 92.4 males.  For every 100 females age 18 and over, there were 92.3 males.

There were 745 housing units at an average density of 1,046.9 per square mile, of the occupied units 345 (50.7%) were owner-occupied and 336 (49.3%) were rented. The homeowner vacancy rate was 3.6%; the rental vacancy rate was 5.1%.  898 people (48.2%) residing in the city. There were 615 housing units at an average density of 0.0 per square mile (334.4/km). The racial makeup of the city in 2010 was 43.9% non-Hispanic White, 0.6% non-Hispanic African American, 1.6% Native American, 2.5% Asian, 0.1% Pacific Islander, 0.2% from other races, and 2.5% from two or more races. Hispanic or Latino of any race were 48.7% of the population.

2000

Of the 567 households 36.0% had children under the age of 18 living with them, 50.1% were married couples living together, 13.4% had a female householder with no husband present, and 31.4% were non-families. 23.6% of households were one person and 9.0% were one person aged 65 or older.  The average household size was 2.73 and the average family size was 3.24.

The age distribution was 27.9% under the age of 18, 7.4% from 18 to 24, 29.6% from 25 to 44, 24.3% from 45 to 64, and 10.9% 65 or older.  The median age was 36 years. For every 100 females, there were 98.1 males.

The median income for a household in the city was $43,355, and the median family income  was $47,656. Males had a median income of $40,089 versus $27,063 for females. The per capita income for the city was $19,882.  About 12.7% of families and 15.5% of the population were below the poverty line, including 23.2% of those under age 18 and 12.2% of those age 65 or over.

Economy
San Juan is largely an agricultural community, though the town has a strong tourist industry, owing to its historic and cultural sites.

Earthbound Farm, based in San Juan, is the largest producer of organic salads in the United States.

The Fremont Peak Observatory, located atop Fremont Peak in the Gabilán Range, is a non-profit astronomical institution serving the local community.

Government

Media
CMAP TV - Community Media Access Partnership operates Channels 17, 18, 19 & 20 on Charter/Spectrum Cable as well as streaming online, offering public access and educational programming to Gilroy and San Benito County as well as covering live civic meetings, including the City of San Juan Bautista.

Notable people
Amalia Mesa-Bains, Chicana feminist author and artist
Ed Walker, last surviving member of the Alaskan Scouts
George H. Moore, member of Los Angeles City Council
Jaime Cortez, artist and LGBT rights activist
Luis Valdez, father of Chicano film and founder of El Teatro Campesino
Robert J. Mazzuca, 11th CEO of the Boy Scouts of America
Rowena Meeks Abdy, modernist painter
Salomón Pico, a Californio "Robin Hood"
Xochiquetzal Candelaria, poet

See also 

Mission San Juan Bautista

References

External links

 

 
Cities in San Benito County, California
Incorporated cities and towns in California
Spanish mission settlements in North America